The eleventh season of Degrassi, a Canadian serial teen drama television series, premiered on July 18, 2011, concluded on May 18, 2012, and consists of 45 episodes. Although only three school years have passed in the story timeline since season six, part one of season eleven is set in the final term of the Spring semester, while part two is set in the fall semester to the first term of the winter semester in the years it aired. Writers have been able to use a semi-floating timeline, so that the issues depicted are modern for their viewers. The first half of this season again depicts the lives of a group of high school sophomores, juniors, and seniors while the second half of this season depicts the lives of a group of high school freshmen, juniors, and seniors as they deal with some of the challenges and issues that teenagers face such as gang violence, parenthood, transphobia, homosexuality, drug use, dysfunctional families, mental disorders, adoption, organ transplantation, crime, bulimia, alcoholism, sex, drug abuse, and murder. 

45 episodes were ordered for this season, and it continues the telenovela/soap opera format that began in season 10, with the show airing new episodes four days a week, for the first 7 weeks. Production for the season began on March 14, 2011, at Epitome Pictures' studios in Toronto, Ontario. In the US, The first 29 episodes (part 1) were promoted as Degrassi: Now or Never, while the last 15 episodes (part 2) were promoted as Degrassi: New Beginnings.

Cast
For the first half of the eleventh season, twenty-five actors receive star billing with twenty-one of them returning from the previous season. Returning cast members include: 

 Raymond Ablack as Savtaj "Sav" Bhandari (13 episodes)
 Charlotte Arnold as Holly J. Sinclair (19 episodes)
 Luke Bilyk as Drew Torres (26 episodes)
 Stefan Brogren as Archie "Snake" Simpson (14 episodes)
 Munro Chambers as Eli Goldsworthy (27 episodes)
 Annie Clark as Fiona Coyne (32 episodes)
 Sam Earle as K.C. Guthrie (19 episodes)
 Jahmil French as Dave Turner (28 episodes)
 Alicia Josipovic as Bianca DeSousa (15 episodes)
 Argiris Karras as Riley Stavros (9 episodes)
 Daniel Kelly as Owen Milligan (18 episodes)
 Shannon Kook-Chun as Zane Park (5 episodes)
 Cory Lee as Ms. Oh (16 episodes)
 Jajube Mandiela as Chantay Black (7 episodes)
 Samantha Munro as Anya MacPherson (12 episodes)
 Aislinn Paul as Clare Edwards (29 episodes)
 A.J. Saudin as Connor DeLaurier (15 episodes)
 Melinda Shankar as Alli Bhandari (28 episodes)
 Jordan Todosey as Adam Torres (25 episodes)
 Jessica Tyler as Jenna Middleton (23 episodes)
 Spencer Van Wyck as Wesley Betenkamp (8 episodes)

Joining the main cast this season are:
 Shanice Banton as Marisol Lewis (30 episodes) (promoted after appearing throughout season ten)
 Justin Kelly as Jake Martin (26 episodes)
 Chloe Rose as Katie Matlin (26 episodes)
 Cristine Prosperi as Imogen Moreno (21 episodes)

The only actor from season ten who did not return this season was Landon Liboiron as Declan Coyne. 

For the second half of the eleventh season, twenty-four actors receive star billing with nineteen of them returning from the first half. Joining the main cast are: 
 Ricardo Hoyos as Zigmund "Zig" Novak (8 episodes)
 Olivia Scriven as Maya Matlin (10 episodes)
 Alex Steele as Tori Santamaria (10 episodes) (previously played Angie Jeremiah in the first five seasons)
 Lyle O'Donohoe as Tristan Milligan (9 episodes) (promoted after appearing in a previous episode this season) 
 Jacob Neayem as Mohammed "Mo" Mashkour (13 episodes) (promoted after recurring in previous episodes this season) 

The six actors from the first half of season eleven who did not return were Raymond Ablack, Charlotte Arnold, Argiris Karras, Shannon Kook-Chun, Jajube Mandiela, and Samantha Munro. All left the series except for Charlotte Arnold who guest starred in the last two episodes.

Crew
Season eleven was produced by Epitome Pictures in association with Bell Media. Funding was provided by The Canadian Media Fund, RBC Royal Bank, The Shaw Rocket Fund, The Independent Production Fund: Mountain Cable Program, The Canadian Film or Video Production Tax Credit, and the Ontario Film and Television Tax Credit.

Linda Schuyler, co-creator of the Degrassi franchise and CEO of Epitome Pictures, served as an executive producer with her husband, and President of Epitome Pictures, Stephen Stohn. Brendon Yorke is also credited as an executive producer, and Sarah Glinski is credited as a co-executive producer. Stefan Brogren was series producer, while David Lowe is credited as producer, and Stephanie Williams the supervising producer. The casting director is Stephanie Gorin, and the editors are Jason B. Irvine, Gordon Thorne, and Paul Whitehead.

The executive story editors are Duana Taha and Matt Huether, the story editors are Cole Bastedo, Michael Grassi, and Ramona Barckert, and Lauren Gosnell is the story coordinator. Episode writers for the season are Ramona Barchert, Cole Bastedo, Sarah Glinski, Lauren Gosnell, Michael Grassi, Matt Huether, James Hurst, Shelley Scarrow, Duana Taha, and Brendon Yorke. The directors of photography are Alwyn Kumst, Mitchell T. Ness and John Berrie, and the directors are Stefan Brogren, Phil Earnshaw, Sturla Gunnarsson, Eleanore Lindo, Farhad Mann, Samir Rehem, and Pat Williams.

Reception
Degrassi was nominated for a GLAAD Media Award in the Best Drama Series category, alongside Pretty Little Liars, Shameless, Torchwood: Miracle Day, and winner Grey's Anatomy. These awards, honour works that fairly and accurately represent the LGBT community and issues. At the 2012 Young Artist Awards, both Cristine Prosperi and A.J. Saudin won awards in the Lead Young Actress and Recurring Young Actor in the Best Performance in a TV Series categories respectively, both sharing with another in their category due to ties. It also received a nomination for a Primetime Emmy Award in the outstanding children's program category, alongside Good Luck Charlie, iCarly, Victorious, and winner Wizards of Waverly Place. At the 1st Canadian Screen Awards Degrassi won the award for "Best Children's or Youth Fiction Program or Series". In addition, Charlotte Arnold and Jahmil French were both nominated for "Best Performance in a Children's or Youth Program or Series" for their performances in "U Don't Know" Part Two and "Smash into You" respectively, also nominated were two performances from season 12, and winner, and fellow Degrassi actress, Melinda Shankar for her performance in How to be Indie.

Episodes
The first 29 episodes ran in July to September 2011 for a total of seven weeks. This season again aired episodes on the same nights in Canada and the United States. The summer season began with a two-episode premiere, and an hour-long special aired between the summer and winter seasons. This season continued the tradition from season 10, that saw the opening credits revised halfway through the season to reflect the changing cast. The last 15 episodes ran from February to May 2012.

DVD releases

References

External links
 List of Degrassi: The Next Generation episodes at IMDB.

Degrassi: The Next Generation seasons
2011 Canadian television seasons
2012 Canadian television seasons